Homersham is the surname and first name of the following people

Surname
S. C. Homersham (c. 1816-1886), English hydraulic engineer

First Name
Homersham Cox (lawyer) (1821-1897), English lawyer and mathematician
Homersham Cox (mathematician) (1857-1918), English mathematician